Micropholis cayennensis is a species of plant in the family Sapotaceae. It is found in Brazil and French Guiana.

References

cayennensis
Least concern plants
Taxonomy articles created by Polbot